Wrestling World 2004 was a professional wrestling event produced by New Japan Pro-Wrestling (NJPW). It took place on January 4 in the Tokyo Dome. Wrestling World 2004 was the thirteenth January 4 Tokyo Dome Show held by NJPW. The show drew 40,000 spectators. Main event of the 15 match show was a unification match between IWGP Heavyweight Champion Shinsuke Nakamura and NWF Heavyweight Champion Yoshihiro Takayama. Nakamura won the match, retiring the NWF Championship after only being active for one year. The undercard saw NJPW mainstay Jushin Thunder Liger defeat Pro Wrestling Noah's Takashi Sugiura to win the GHC Junior Heavyweight Championship, marking the first time a Noah championship changed hands at a January 4 Tokyo Dome Show. Additionally Gedo and Jado successfully defended the IWGP Junior Heavyweight Tag Team Championship against Heat and Tiger Mask and Hiroshi Tanahashi retained the IWGP U-30 Openweight Championship against Yutaka Yoshie.

Production

Background
The January 4 Tokyo Dome Show is NJPW's biggest annual event and has been called "the largest professional wrestling show in the world outside of the United States" and the "Japanese equivalent to the Super Bowl".

Storylines
Wrestling World 2004 featured professional wrestling matches that involved different wrestlers from pre-existing scripted feuds and storylines. Wrestlers portrayed villains, heroes, or less distinguishable characters in scripted events that built tension and culminated in a wrestling match or series of matches.

Results

References

External links
NJPW.co.jp 

2004
January 2004 events in Japan
2004 in professional wrestling
2004 in Tokyo